Highway 7 is a highway in the South District of Israel from Ashdod to Yesodot. It connects the Port of Ashdod with the Trans-Israel Highway (Highway 6).

Upgrade

The road was rebuilt to include additional lanes and interchanges to create a continuous controlled-access highway between Ashdod Interchange with Highway 4 in the west and Highway 3 in the east. Upon completion in August 2014, the section previously numbered Highway 41 between Highway 4 and Highway 40 was renumbered "7".

Junctions (west to east)

See also
 List of highways in Israel

References

7